Shirin Abedinirad (born 1986) is an Iranian artist best known for her mirror installations. Her works often present optical illusions, as she experiments with light and movement through mirrors. Having worked on sculptural installations, performance and video art, Abedinirad has explored the pivotal concept of self-identity in the broader context of society. In 2016, she authored a book titled Conceptual Art & Fashion Design in the 21st Century, which was published by Nazar Art Publication in Iran.

Early life and education 
Abedinirad was born in 1986 in Tabriz, Iran. Beginning her art career with painting, she has studied Fashion and Textile Design at Dr Shariaty University in Tehran. The principal focus of her dissertation was conceptual art and the ways in which it relates to fashion.

She has also studied video art under the supervision of the Iranian filmmaker Abbas Kiarostami who selected her along with a few other artists to participate in his workshop at IBAFF Film Festival in Murcia, Spain, in 2013. At the closing ceremony of the Festival, Abedinirad presented a performance art piece which she dedicated to the American video artist Bill Viola in his presence at the event.

In 2014, Abedinirad was awarded a one-year artist scholarship to engage in the cultural projects of Benetton’s Fabrica research centre in Treviso, Italy.

Works 
Abedinirad explores complex human issues through her symbolic works. Her installations examine the connections between human beings and nature. Both desert and industrial places were used as the settings for Evocation (2013) and Heaven on Earth (2014) mirror installations, in which numerous mirrors were embedded on the ground to reflect the sky above. Creating skyward reflections through mirrors, Abedinirad sought to display the relationship between the human mind and the natural elements. The mirrors were particularly used to symbolise water in the middle of Iran’s dry land and Italy’s man-made structures.

In August 2015, Abedinirad completed her Mirrored Ziggurat installation as part of the Underbelly Arts Festival in Sydney, Australia. Inspired by the pyramidal structure of ziggurats in ancient Mesopotamia, this installation distorts the viewers’ perception and presents a transformative view of the self.

In October 2015, Abedinirad collaborated with the Italian interaction designer Gugo Torelli on a project called Babel Tower. The sculpture built from glass boxes sat for a few days in Dasht-e Kavir, a desert in the central Iranian Plateau. Powered by an Arduino processor, the tower sensed changes in weather conditions that added a kinetic feature to its nine tiers. The sculpture was inspired by an old utopian ideal appearing in the Biblical story Genesis 11. As Abedinirad explained: “[This] is an interactive installation that recontextualises the spiritual architecture of the Tower of Babel with modern materials.” This artwork was selected as the eight remote installations published by Wired magazine in March 2017. In December 2017, its photograph was also published by Stanford University Press as the cover of a book titled Archaeology of Babel.

Not only do Mirrored Ziggurat and Babel Tower bring humans and Nature closer together like her previous works, but they also create a union of ancient history with today’s world.

Exhibitions 
In 2015, Abedinirad’s Mirrored Zuggurat was featured on Cockatoo Island, Australia, for the two-day Underbelly Arts Festival. In 2016, her Sulūk sculpture was put on display on One Belt One Road Visual Arts Exhibition taking place at Sotheby’s Hong Kong Gallery. Organised by the Hong Kong Federation of Women, the event illustrated the importance of female visual artists among the Belt and Road nations across Asia, Europe and Africa. Among other artists whose works were exhibited in this Gallery were Yayoi Kusama and Joana Vasconcelos. The exhibition explored the ties between the ancient Silk Road and the Belt and Road Initiative.

From April–July 2017, Abedinirad’s video art Gliss was displayed in Andorra Land Art International Biennale. From August–September 2017, she collaborated with Dionne Lee on a video exhibition titled Eleven and a Half Hours, which was featured at Aggregate Space Gallery in West Oakland. Curated by Shaghayegh Cyrous, the exhibition focused on striking similarities in the everyday lives of the two Iranian and American women, even though their locations and cultures were different. In the same year, the video of her Babel Tower was exhibited at FILE ANIMA+ Electronic Language International Festival in São Paulo, Brazil. Since October 2017, In Between (Part II): So Far has been on view at Mana Contemporary which offers six installations by six women that work to shape Iranian contemporary video art. Displaying Abedinirad’s Passage, the show is the second part of an exhibition series curated by Shahram Karimi.

In March 2018, she participated in Lorne Sculpture Biennale showing her Breakwaver installation.

See also
 Islamic art
 Iranian art
 Islamic calligraphy
 List of Iranian artists

References

External links
 

Iranian women artists
1986 births
Living people